This is a list of the government ministries of the Republic of Liberia in the period 2003–2014.

 Ministry of Agriculture, Liberia
 Ministry of Commerce and Industry, Liberia
 Ministry of Education, Liberia
 Ministry of Finance and Development Planning Liberia
 Ministry of Foreign Affairs, Liberia
 Ministry of Gender, Children and Social Protection, and Development, Liberia
 Ministry of Health and Social Welfare, Liberia
 Ministry of Information, Cultural Affairs and Tourism, Liberia
 Ministry of Internal Affairs, Liberia
 Ministry of Justice, Liberia
 Ministry of Labor, Liberia
 Liberia Mines and Minerals Regulatory Authority, Liberia 
 Ministry of National Defense, Liberia
 Ministry of National Security, Liberia
 Ministry of Post and Telecommunications, Liberia
 Ministry of Public Works, Liberia
 Ministry of State, Liberia
 Ministry of Transport, Liberia
 Ministry of Youth and Sports, Liberia

References

See also 
 Government of Liberia
 Cabinet of Liberia

Liberia politics-related lists